Heliopsis procumbens is a Mexican species of flowering plant in the family Asteraceae. It is native to central Mexico from Jalisco and Michoacán east to Veracruz.

References

External links
Photo of herbarium specimen at Missouri Botanical Garden, collected in México State in 1935

procumbens
Flora of Mexico
Plants described in 1881